Sinilabeo cirrhinoides is a species of cyprinid of the genus Sinilabeo. It inhabits the Mekong river in Yunnan, China. It has a maximum length of  among unsexed males and is considered harmless to humans. It has not been evaluated on the IUCN Red List.

References

Cyprinid fish of Asia
Freshwater fish of China
Taxa named by Wu Hsien-Wen
Taxa named by Lin Ren-Duan
Fish described in 1977